The 2007 season was Santos Futebol Clube's ninety-fifth season in existence and the club's forty-eighth consecutive season in the top flight of Brazilian football. Santos won the Campeonato Paulista for the second consecutive year and the 18th in history. Santos' Copa Libertadores campaign was very well, exiting in the semi-finals with a defeat on aggregate score against Grêmio. 
Santos ended the Campeonato Brasileiro in the 2nd position, 13 points behind leaders São Paulo.

Players

Squad information

Source:

Appearances and goals

|-
!colspan=13 style="background: #F8F8FF" align=center| Players who left the club during the season
|-

Top scorers

Disciplinary record

Copa Libertadores squad

Source:

Transfers

In

Out

Out on loan

Competitions

Overall summary

Detailed overall summary

Campeonato Brasileiro

League table

Results summary

Results by round

Matches

Campeonato Paulista

Results summary

First stage

League table

Matches

Knockout stage

Semi-finals

Finals

Copa Libertadores

First stage

Group stage

Knockout stage

Round of 16

Quarter-finals

Semi-finals

References

External links
Official Site

2007
Santos F.C.